The pyrite group of minerals is a set of cubic crystal system minerals with diploidal structure. Each metallic element is bonded to six "dumbbell" pairs of non-metallic elements and each "dumbbell" pair is bonded to six metal atoms.

The group is named for its most common member, pyrite (fool's gold), which is sometimes explicitly distinguished from the group's other members as iron pyrite.

Pyrrhotite (magnetic pyrite) is magnetic, and is composed of iron and sulfur, but it has a different structure and is not in the pyrite group.

Pyrite group minerals 
Pyrite-group minerals include:

 Aurostibite 
 Cattierite 
 Dzharkenite 
 Erlichmanite 
 Fukuchilite 
 Gaotaiite 
 Geversite 
 Hauerite 
 Insizwaite 
 Krut'aite 
 Krutovite 
 Laurite 
 Penroseite 
 Pyrite 
 Sperrylite
 Trogtalite 
 Vaesite 
 Villamanínite

References

External links